Lenamore is a townland in County Londonderry, Northern Ireland. It is at the foot of the mountain Benbradagh near Dungiven.  It was once a village more populous than Drumsurn until the introduction of electricity to that village. It is situated within Causeway Coast and Glens district.

Other example
The village of Legan, County Longford is also known as Lenamore.

See also
List of villages in Northern Ireland
List of towns in Northern Ireland

References

Townlands of County Londonderry
Causeway Coast and Glens district